The Río Blanco (Spanish for "white river") is a river of Argentina near Calingasta in the southwestern part of the province of San Juan. It is a tributary of the Río de los Patos which is one of the three sources of the San Juan River which empties into the Desaguadero River basin.

See also
List of rivers of Argentina

References
 Rand McNally, The New International Atlas, 1993.
  GEOnet Names Server

Rivers of Argentina